The Troyte River is a river of the West Coast region of New Zealand's South Island. It rises in the Hooker Range, 15 kilometres west of Aoraki / Mount Cook, flowing west then north to reach the Karangarua River.

See also
List of rivers of New Zealand

References

Rivers of the West Coast, New Zealand
Westland District
Rivers of New Zealand